Atrecus is a genus of beetles belonging to the family Staphylinidae.

The genus was first described by Jacquelin du Val in 1856.

The species of this genus are found in Eurasia and Northern America.

Species:
 Atrecus affinis
 Atrecus longiceps
 Atrecus pilicornis

References

Staphylininae
Staphylinidae genera